John Cogswell (1592–1669) was a leading figure and large landowner in the early history of Ipswich, Massachusetts and a deputy for the General Court of Massachusetts. He is the immigrant ancestor to a large number of notable Americans.

Biography
John Cogswell, born in Westbury Leigh, Wiltshire, England, was a successful merchant in London, England before migrating to the Massachusetts Bay Colony in 1635. He married Elizabeth, the daughter of Rev. William Thompson, vicar of Westbury in 1615. Twenty years later, in 1635, Cogswell and his family embarked on the Angel Gabriel, for Massachusetts. However, the ship was driven onto rocks on the coast of Maine during the Great Colonial Hurricane of 1635. Cogswell salvaged most of what he lost from the wreck and headed south for Boston before settling in Ipswich.

In Ipswich, Cogswell was granted 300 acres of land (now known as Cogswell's Grant) and he received freeman status to allow him to run for public office. He eventually became a deputy to the General Court for Ipswich, in addition to fulfilling functions for the town. Cogswell died in 1669. He was honored with a five-mile long funeral procession followed by a service conducted by Rev. William Hubbard. The historian Darrett B. Rutman states that Cogswell's will is "exceptional in providing for the formal education of a daughter." Although he was a man of reputation in his time, his greatest legacy for posterity is surviving the great hurricane and leaving many celebrated descendants.

Descendants
John Cogswell and Elizabeth Thompson had many children; however, the following children left notable descendants:

William Cogswell (1619–1696). He married Susannah Hawkes. He and his son, Jonathan, signed a petition to protect John Proctor and his wife Elizabeth during the Salem witch trials. An influential citizen of Ipswich, he acquired the Rev. John Wise to be the first pastor of Chebacco Parish.

John Cogswell Jr (1622–1653). He died of a snake bite on a return voyage from London, a year after the death of his wife, Elizabeth Thoth (of England). He left behind three children, John, Samuel and Elizabeth Cogswell – the youngest but a year old.

Hannah Cogswell (1626–1704). She married Deacon Cornelius Waldo.

Abigail Cogswell (1641–1728). She married Thomas Clarke.

Sarah Cogswell (1645–1692). She married Simon Tuttle.

External links
 Cogswell Family Association
 
 Historic New England: Cogswell's Grant
 Amazon link to the book Descendants of John Cogswell
 Amazon link to the book Ancestry of Diana
 link to the book The Cogswells in America
 The Great Migration: Immigrants to New England, 1634–1635, vol 2, C-F
 Winthrop's Boston by Darrett B Rutman
 Link to Massachusetts signers related to Cogswell
 Link to some writers related to Cogswell
 Ancestry of Tennessee Williams
 Ancestry of Thomas Pynchon
 link with famous New England descendants of Cogswell
 link with Cogswell's connection to Presidents Adams and Coolidge and Prime Minister Childers
 link with Cogswell's political positions

People of colonial Massachusetts
1669 deaths
Members of the colonial Massachusetts House of Representatives
1592 births
People from Westbury, Wiltshire
Kingdom of England emigrants to Massachusetts Bay Colony